Aéroplanes Voisin was a French aircraft manufacturing company established in 1905 by Gabriel Voisin and his brother Charles, and was continued by Gabriel after Charles died in an automobile accident in 1912; the full official company name then became Société Anonyme des Aéroplanes G. Voisin. 
During World War I, it was a major producer of military aircraft, notably the Voisin III.  After the war Gabriel Voisin abandoned the aviation industry, and set up a company to design and produce luxury automobiles, called Avions Voisin.

Early History

Gabriel Voisin had been employed by Ernest Archdeacon to work on the construction of gliders and then entered into partnership with  Louis Blériot, to form the company Ateliers d' Aviation Edouard Surcouf, Blériot et Voisin in 1905. Following a disagreement, Gabriel Voisin bought out Blériot and on 5 November 1906 established the Appareils d'Aviation Les Frères Voisin with his brother Charles . The company, based in the Parisian suburb of Billancourt, was the first commercial aircraft factory in the world.
It created Europe's first manned, heavier-than-air powered aircraft capable of a sustained (1 km), circular, controlled flight, including take-off and landing, the Voisin-Farman I. 
Having learned to fly with a Voisin, on 8 March 1910, Raymonde de Laroche became the first woman to receive a pilot licence when the Aéro-Club de France issued her licence #36.
In South Africa, on 28 December 1909, French aviator Albert Kimmerling made the first manned, heavier-than-air powered flight in Africa in a Voisin 1907 biplane.

Like many early aircraft companies, Voisin built machines to the designs of their customers which helped support their own experiments. The company's first customers were a M. Florencie, who commissioned them to build an ornithopter he had designed, and Henri Kapferer, for whom they built a pusher biplane of their own design. The latter was underpowered, having a Buchet engine of only , and it failed to fly. However, Kapferer introduced them to Leon Delagrange, for whom they built a similar machine, powered by a  Antoinette engine. In turn Delagrange introduced them to Henri Farman, who ordered an identical aircraft. These two aircraft are often referred to by their owners' names as the Voisin-Delagrange No.1 and the Voisin-Farman No.1, and were the foundation of the company's success. On 13 January 1908 Farman used his aircraft to win the "Grand Prix de l'aviation" offered by Ernest Archdeacon and Henry Deutsch de la Meurthe for the first closed-circuit flight of over a kilometer. Since the Wright Brothers would provide no evidence of their own accomplishments, they were widely disbelieved at the time, so this was a major breakthrough in the conquest of the air, and brought Voisin many orders for similar aircraft. Around sixty would be built.

Major Designs of 1907-1914

1907 Voisin 1907 biplane
1909 Voisin Tractor
Only one built.
1910 Voisin Type de Course
1910 Voisin Type Militaire
1910 Type Bordeaux
1911 Voisin Canard
Tail first pusher design initially flown as a landplane but later fitted with floats. Examples were sold to the French and Russia Navies.
 1911 Type Tourism
1912 Type Monaco
Smaller version of the Canard floatplane. Two were built to take part in the 1912 Monaco Aero Meeting.
1912 Voisin Icare Aero-Yacht
Flying boat built for Henry Deutsch de la Meurthe with a six-wheeled boat hull suspended below the wings.
1912 Voisin Type L or Voisin Type I & II
A pod and boom pusher biplane developed for the French Army's 1912 trials. It performed successfully, and some seventy were built in France, and a small number in Russia
1913 Voisin Canon
Six wheeled triple tailed pod and boom pusher armed with a 37mm Hotchkiss cannon
1914 Type LA or Voisin III
Development of the L with detail improvements but of the same general configuration.

Voisin designs in World War I

Production of the Voisin III Type LA and LAS increased with the outbreak of the First World War, with examples being built under licence in Italy by S.I.T., in Russia by Anatra, Breshnev-Moller, Dux Lebedev and Schetinin, and in the UK by Savages of King's Lynn, with production exceeding 1,350 airframes. Examples would also be used by the Belgian and Romanian Air Services, and a few even survived the war to be used in the Ukraine, and in Russia. Soon after the outbreak of the First World War, it became apparent that the French aviation industry could not produce aircraft in sufficient numbers to meet military requirements. Manufacturers from various other fields became aviation subcontractors, and later license-builders as did many smaller aircraft manufacturers who had been unable to secure orders for their own designs. By 1918, Voisin was involved with the Voisin-Lafresnaye company, a major constructor of airframes, and the Voisin-Lefebvre company, a major builder of aircraft engines.

The Voisin III was followed by a small number of the 37mm cannon armed Voisin IV Type LB and Type LBS. The B in the factory designations indicate that the airframe was equipped with a cannon, although some had it removed in service. The S indicates that the engine was raised (surélevé) compared to the original installation.

Three hundred of the improved Voisin V Type LAS aircraft followed.

The Voisin VI Type LAS was a development of the V fitted with a  Salmson radial, of which only around 50 were built despite the improved performance as the basic type was considered to be obsolete.

The larger Type LC, Voisin VII, followed in 1916 with the engine cooling radiators moved to the nose, but was not a success as it was badly underpowered and only a hundred of these were built.

Voisin built a large Triplane powered by four  Salmson water-cooled aero-engines in 1915 with twin superimposed fuselage booms, however it attracted no orders, but its wings were reused in 1916 for the E.28 triplane bomber which was now powered by four  V8 Hispano-Suiza 8B engines, which likewise failed to secure any orders.

Also in 1915, Voisin built the Type M in which the fuselage was below the lower wing, and the engine filled the gap between the wings, however neither it, nor the otherwise similar twin fuselage Type O were successful.

Following the Voisin VII came the more powerful, and more successful Voisin VIII Type LAP and Type LBP. This was the French army's main night bomber in 1916 and 1917, with over one thousand built.

The Voisin IX, or Type LC (the designation was reused), was an unsuccessful lightened development of the VIII for a reconnaissance aeroplane, which lost out to the Salmson 2 and Breguet 14.

The Voisin X, Type LAR and Type LBR, was the Voisin VIII with a more reliable, lighter and more powerful  Renault 12Fe engine in place of the  Peugeot 8Aa used on the VIII. Deliveries were severely delayed, but some nine hundred were built before the end of the war. In 1918, a Voisin X (No. 3500) was used to create the Voisin 'Aerochir' ('Ambulance').  The aircraft was capable of flying a surgeon, together with an operating table and support equipment, including an x-ray machine and autoclave, into the battlefield. Under-wing panniers could be carry  of equipment. Another X was converted into a drone, and flown in 1918 and again in 1923.

The Voisin XI was a development of the X powered by a  Panhard 12Bc, with a slightly longer wingspan and assorted detail changes. Only about 10 were built and it did not see service.

The final Voisin design, the Voisin XII, was successful in trials in 1918 for the BN2 bomber competition, but with the end of the war, no production was ordered. The Voisin XII was a large, four-engined biplane night bomber. Several projects for heavy bombers for the next bomber specification (BN3/4) may have been based on the XII, but fitted with larger Salmson or Hispano-Suiza engines, but were not built.

In the 1930s, a glider was built by a Louis Voisin, however he had no connection to Gabriel Voisin.

Post World War I

After 1918, Gabriel Voisin abandoned the aviation industry in favor of automobile construction under the name Avions Voisin.

Notes

References

Bibliography
  Carlier, Claude, Sera Maître du Monde, qui sera  Maître de l'Air:  La Création de l'Aviation militaire française. Paris: Economica/ISC, 2004. 
 Davilla, James J., & Soltan, Arthur M., French Aircraft of the First World War. Stratford, Connecticut: Flying Machines Press, 1997. 
  Lacaze, Henri, Les Aéroplanes Voisin, Collection Histoire de L'Aviation N°39. Paris:LELA PRESSE, 2018.
 Opdycke, Leonard E French Aeroplanes Before the Great War Atglen, PA: Schiffer, 1999 
 Voisin, Gabriel, Mes 10,000 Cerfs-volants, Editions La Table Ronde, Paris, 1960.
 ( Italy ) Grassani, Enrico "Elisa Deroche alias Raymonde de Laroche. La presenza femminile negli anni pionieristici dell'aviazione" Editoriale Delfino, Milano 2015. 

Defunct aircraft manufacturers of France
Manufacturing companies established in 1906
Manufacturing companies disestablished in 1918
French companies established in 1906
1918 disestablishments in France